Juan Antonio "Chi-Chi" Rodríguez (born October 23, 1935) is a Puerto Rican professional golfer. The winner of eight PGA Tour events, he was the first Puerto Rican to be inducted into the World Golf Hall of Fame.

Early years
Rodríguez was born into a poor family in Rio Piedras, Puerto Rico. He was one of six siblings. His father used to earn $18 a week as a laborer and cattle handler. When Rodríguez was seven years old, he helped the family by earning money as a water carrier on a sugar plantation. One day Juan wandered off into a golf course. When he saw that the caddies were earning more money than he was, he decided to become a caddie himself.

Rodríguez would take a branch from a guava tree and turn it into a golf club. Using a metal can as a "golf ball," he would practice what he had seen the "real" golfers do, teaching himself how to play golf. By the time he was nine years old, he was proficient at golf, and in 1947, at the age of 12, he scored a 67.

In 1954, when Rodríguez was 19, he joined the United States Army. During his breaks, he would visit whichever golf course was nearby, where he continued to perfect his game.

Rodríguez, with characteristic charisma, would often make jokes about his past hardships on the golf course, such as, "How long does John Daly drive a golf ball? When I was a kid, I didn't go that far on vacation." And, "Playing golf is not hot work. Cutting sugar cane for a dollar a day — that's hot work. Hotter than my first wristwatch."

PGA Tour

Rodríguez turned professional in 1960. In 1963, at age 28, Rodríguez won the Denver Open, which he considers his favorite win. He won eight titles on the PGA Tour between 1963 and 1979.

At first Rodríguez used to put his hat over the hole whenever he made a birdie or eagle. After he heard that other golfers were complaining about his little act, he decided to try something new. Juan developed his signature "toreador dance," where he would make believe that the ball was a "bull" and that his putter was a "sword," and he would terminate the "bull." Even though he was a very small man, he had a special stance and swing with the driver that enabled him to hit the ball as far as the longest drivers on the tour. Rodríguez represented Puerto Rico on 12 World Cup teams.

Senior PGA Tour
Rodríguez became eligible to play on the Senior PGA Tour (now known as the Champions Tour) in 1985 and did so for many years with great success, earning 22 tournament victories between 1986 and 1993. He was the first player on the Senior PGA Tour to win the same event in three consecutive years. He set a tour record with eight consecutive birdies en route to a win at the 1987 Silver Pages Classic. In 1991, he lost an 18-hole playoff to Jack Nicklaus in the U.S. Senior Open.

Awards and honors
In 1986, Rodríguez won the Hispanic Recognition Award. In 1988, he was named Replica's Hispanic Man of the Year. In 1989, Rodríguez was voted the Bob Jones Award, the highest honor given by the United States Golf Association in recognition of distinguished sportsmanship in golf. He received the 1989 Old Tom Morris Award from the Golf Course Superintendents Association of America, GCSAA's highest honor. In 1992, Juan "Chi-Chi" Rodríguez was inducted into the World Golf Hall of Fame, the first Puerto Rican so honored.

Rodriguez was the 1995 Rose Parade Grand Marshal.

Later years
On one occasion, Rodríguez had a brief encounter with Mother Teresa. He considers that moment as the greatest moment in his life. This encounter inspired him to help others. Rodríguez, together with former pro golfer Bill Hayes and Bob James, established the "Chi-Chi Rodríguez Youth Foundation", an afterschool program at the Glen Oaks Golf Course in Clearwater, Florida. The principal idea behind the foundation is to instill self-esteem in young people who are victims of abuse, have experienced minor brushes with the law, or have suffered other hardships. Rodríguez also bought his mother a house and gave financial help to his brothers and sisters.

In October 1998, Rodríguez suffered a heart attack. He had an angioplasty to clear the blocked artery and made a recovery. He is married and has one daughter.

In 2004, Rodriguez made a cameo in the movie Welcome to Mooseport, shown golfing with the "President" portrayed by Gene Hackman.

In May 2010, Rodríguez was robbed at his house in Guayama, Puerto Rico, by three people who stole $500,000 in cash and jewelry. Rodríguez and his wife were awakened at 1:45 in the morning by masked men who then tied them up and robbed them.

On March 11, 2012, at the age of 76, Rodríguez participated as an honorary player in the Puerto Rico Open. He played 18 holes as his final official round as a professional in the PGA. There were several events honoring Rodríguez associated with the Tournament, and the tribute received extensive media coverage.

Professional wins (37)

PGA Tour wins (8)

PGA Tour playoff record (3–1)

Other wins (4)
1963 Colombian Open
1976 Pepsi-Cola Mixed Team Championship (with Jo Ann Washam)
1979 Bahamas Open, Panama Open (tie with Butch Baird)

Senior PGA Tour wins (22)

*Note: Tournament shortened to 36/54 holes due to rain.

Senior PGA Tour playoff record (1–7)

Other senior wins (3)
1988 Japan PGA Senior Championship, Senior Skins Game
1989 Senior Skins Game

Results in major championships

CUT = missed the half-way cut
WD = withdrew
"T" indicates a tie for a place

Summary

Most consecutive cuts made – 9 (1972 U.S. Open – 1974 PGA)
Longest streak of top-10s – 1 (four times)

Senior major championships

Wins (2)

Results timeline

NYF = Tournament not yet founded
CUT = missed the half-way cut
WD  = withdrew
"T" indicates a tie for a place.

Note: Rodríguez never played in the Senior Open Championship.

Team appearances
World Cup (representing Puerto Rico): 1961, 1962, 1963, 1964, 1965, 1966, 1967, 1968, 1971, 1974, 1976, 1993
Ryder Cup (representing the United States): 1973 (winners)
Wendy's 3-Tour Challenge (representing Senior PGA Tour): 1992, 1993 (winners)

Cultural references 
A painted image of Rodriguez was used to sell golf merchandise in the 1970s. The members of the new wave band Devo saw one of these promotional images and decided that it represented the artificiality of popular culture. They used the image in their satirical manifesto (on the de-evolution of humanity) and also featured it on the artwork of their single "Be Stiff", which was released in early 1978, before they had signed to a major label. Four months later, they signed to Warner Bros. Records. For their debut album, Q: Are We Not Men? A: We Are Devo!, they wanted to use Rodriguez's image for the album cover art, but Warner rejected it, due to not having Rodriguez's permission. As the band sought permission, they suggested that the image could be altered to not resemble Rodriguez so closely. Warner's art department slightly changed the ears, eyes, nose and other features and began album production. By the time the band secured Rodriguez's permission, it was too late to use the original one. Warner sent Rodriguez $2,500 and 50 copies of the album, but he only listened to it once, preferring music by vocalists such as Dean Martin.

In an episode of the American sitcom WKRP in Cincinnati (season 1, episode 3, "Les on a Ledge"), newscaster Les Nessman, reporting on a golf tournament, mispronounces Rodriguez's name as "Chy Chy Rodrigweez," despite efforts to correct him.

See also

List of Puerto Ricans
List of golfers with most Champions Tour wins

References

External links

 
 

Puerto Rican male golfers
PGA Tour golfers
PGA Tour Champions golfers
Ryder Cup competitors for the United States
Winners of senior major golf championships
World Golf Hall of Fame inductees
Puerto Rican Army personnel
People from Río Piedras, Puerto Rico
United States Army soldiers
1935 births
Living people